Kyrgyz anti-LGBT bill is a bill that was introduced in 2014 in the Kyrgyz Parliament to criminalize expression that creates "a positive attitude towards non-traditional sexual relations, using mass media or information and telecommunication networks", which was strongly criticized by national and international human rights and LGBT rights activists because it would criminalize LGBT community, especially homosexuality.

It would be a harsher version of the Russian gay propaganda law. It was also criticized for its ambiguous wording, which could lead to a broader interpretation. For example, Australian expert Cai Wilkinson points out that the "non-traditional sexual relations" referred to in the bill could be interpreted as non-procreative sexual relations outside marriage, which could also undermine efforts to combat HIV and promote safe sex in general.

Initially, the bill was briefly withdrawn in the face of international pressure, but was later taken up again. On October 15, the bill was passed its first reading, in a vote of 79 to 7. It has received widespread international opposition, and has been delayed multiple times. A final vote on the bill was expected to take place in 2016, but was postponed and ultimately failed to pass.

References 

LGBT rights in Kyrgyzstan
2014 in Kyrgyzstan
2016 in Kyrgyzstan
Homophobia
Censorship of LGBT issues
2014 in LGBT history
LGBT-related controversies
LGBT-related legislation